Pinson may refer to:

Places
Pinson, Alabama
Pinson, Tennessee
Pinson Mounds, a prehistoric site in West Tennessee

People with the surname
Bobby Pinson (born 1972), American country music artist
Julie Pinson (born 1967), American actress
Theo Pinson (born 1995), American basketball player
Vada Pinson (1938–1995), American baseball player and coach

See also
Mimi Pinson (1924 film)
Mimi Pinson (1958 film)
Richard Pynson (c. 1449–c. 1529), Norman-English printer